The Flint Creek Farm is a historic farm in Field Township, Minnesota, United States.  From 1915 to 1933 the farm was owned by executives of the area's largest lumber company as a side venture supplying food and hay to the company's lumber camps.  Three buildings and a windmill tower are still standing from this period.

Background
The property was listed on the National Register of Historic Places in 1989 as the Flint Creek Farm Historic District for its local significance in the themes of agriculture and industry.  It was nominated as one of only two known surviving Minnesota farms established to supply a major lumber company (the other being the Ann River Logging Company Farm in Kanabec County).  It was also nominated for its associations with its two owners, influential Virginia and Rainy Lake Lumber Company executives Samuel J. Cusson (c. 1862–1919) and Chester H. Rogers (1866–1933).

See also
 National Register of Historic Places listings in St. Louis County, Minnesota

References

1915 establishments in Minnesota
Buildings and structures in St. Louis County, Minnesota
Farms on the National Register of Historic Places in Minnesota
Historic districts on the National Register of Historic Places in Minnesota
Logging in the United States
National Register of Historic Places in St. Louis County, Minnesota